Navajo is a "verb-heavy" language – it has a great preponderance of verbs but relatively few nouns. In addition to verbs and nouns, Navajo has other elements such as pronouns, clitics of various functions, demonstratives, numerals, postpositions, adverbs, and conjunctions, among others. Harry Hoijer grouped all of the above into a word-class he called particles (i.e., Navajo would then have verbs, nouns, and particles). Navajo has no words that would correspond to adjectives in English grammar: verbs provide the adjectival functionality.

Verbs
The key element in Navajo is the verb. Verbs are composed of an abstract stem to which inflectional or derivational prefixes are added. Every verb must have at least one prefix. The prefixes are affixed to the verb in a specified order.

The Navajo verb can be sectioned into different components. The verb stem is composed of an abstract root and an often fused suffix. The stem together with a "classifier" prefix (and sometimes other thematic prefixes) make up the verb theme. The thematic prefixes are prefixes that are non-productive, have limited derivational function, and no longer have a clearly defined meaning. Examples of thematic prefixes, include the archaic yá- prefix, which only occurs on the verb stem -tééh/-tiʼ meaning "to talk" as in yáłtiʼ "he's talking". The theme is then combined with derivational prefixes that in turn make up the verb base. Finally, inflectional prefixes (which Young & Morgan call "paradigmatic prefixes") are affixed to the base – producing a complete Navajo verb.

Verb template
The prefixes that occur on a Navajo verb are added in specified more or less rigid order according to prefix type. This type of morphology is called a position class template (or slot-and-filler template). Below is a table of a recent proposal of the Navajo verb template (Young & Morgan 1987). Edward Sapir and Harry Hoijer were the first to propose an analysis of this type. A given verb does not have a prefix for every position. In fact, most Navajo verbs are not as complex as the template might suggest: the maximum number of prefixes is around eight.

The Navajo verb is composed of a verb stem and a set of prefixes. The prefixes can be divided into a conjunct prefix set and disjunct prefix set. The disjunct prefixes occur on the outer left edge of the verb. The conjunct prefixes occur after the disjunct prefixes, closer to the verb stem. Two types of prefixes can be distinguished by their different phonological behavior.

{| class="wikitable" frame=void style="vertical-align:top; text-align:center; white-space:nowrap;"
|-
| disjunct prefixes
| conjunct prefixes
| stem
|}

The prefix complex may be subdivided into 11 positions, with some of the positions having even further subdivisions:

Although prefixes are generally found in a specific position, some prefixes change order by the process of metathesis. For example, prefix ʼa- (3i object pronoun) usually occurs before di-, as in

  ʼadisbąąs "I'm starting to drive some kind of wheeled vehicle along" [ ← ʼa- + di- + sh- + ł + -bąąs].

However, when ʼa- occurs with the prefixes di- and ni-, the ʼa- metathesizes with di-, leading to an order of di- + ʼa- + ni-, as in

 diʼnisbąąs "I'm in the act of driving some vehicle (into something) & getting stuck" [ ← di-ʼa-ni-sh-ł-bąąs ← ʼa- + di- + ni- + sh- + ł + -bąąs]

instead of the expected  ʼadinisbąąs (ʼa-di-ni-sh-ł-bąąs) (ʼa- is reduced to ʼ-).

Although the verb template model of analysis has been traditionally used to describe the Navajo verb, other analyses have been proposed by Athabascanists.

Pronominal inflection

Navajo verbs have pronominal (i.e. pronoun) prefixes that mark both subjects and objects. The prefixes can vary in certain modes, particularly the perfective mode (See Mode and Aspect section below for a discussion of modes). The prefixes are inflected according to person and number. The basic subject prefixes (and their abbreviations as used by Young & Morgan) are listed in the table below:

{| class="IPA wikitable" frame=void style="vertical-align:top; text-align:center; white-space:nowrap;"
! rowspan="2" | Number !! colspan="2" | Subject prefixes !! colspan="2" | Object prefixes
|-
! Singular !! Dual-plural !! Singular !! Dual-plural
|-
! First (1)
| -sh- || -Vd- || shi- || rowspan="2" | nihi-
|-
! Second (2)
| ni- || -oh- || ni-
|-
! Third (3)
| colspan="2" rowspan="2" | -∅- || colspan="2" | bi-
|-
! Third (3o)
| colspan="2" | yi-
|-
! Fourth (3a)
| colspan="2" | ji- || colspan="2" | ha- ~ ho-
|-
! Indefinite (3i)
| colspan="2" | ʼa- || colspan="2" | ʼa-
|-
! Space (3s)
| colspan="2" | ha- ~ ho- || colspan="2" | ha- ~ ho-
|-
! Reflexive
| colspan="2" | – || colspan="2" | (ʼá)-di-
|-
! Reciprocal
| colspan="2" | – || colspan="2" | ʼahi-
|}

The subject prefixes occur in two different positions. The first and second subject prefixes (-sh-, -Vd-, ni-, -oh-) occur in position 8 directly before the classifier prefixes. The fourth, indefinite, and "space" subject prefixes (ji-, ʼa-, ha-~ho-) are known as "deictic subject pronouns" and occur in position 5. The third person subject is marked by the absence of a prefix, which is usually indicated with a zero prefix -∅- in position 8. The object prefixes can occur in position 4 as direct objects, in position 1a as "null postpositions", or in position 0 as the object of postpositions that have been incorporated into the verb complex.

The fourth person subject prefix ji- is a kind of obviative third person. It refers primarily to persons or personified animals (unlike the regular third person). It has a number of uses including:
 referring to the main character in narratives
 distinguishing between two third person referents
 referring politely or impersonally to certain socially-distant individuals (e.g. when speaking to opposite-sex siblings and relatives through marriage, giving admonitions, speaking of the dead)
When used as an impersonal, it may be translated into English as "one" as in béésh bee njinéego hálaʼ da jiigish "one can cut one's hand playing with knives". The "space" prefix can be translated as "area, place, space, impersonal it" as in halgai "the area/place is white" and nahałtin "it is raining". The prefix has two forms: ha- and ho- with ho- having derived forms such as hw- and hwi-.

An example paradigm for "to freeze" (imperfective mode) showing the subject prefixes:

{| class="IPA wikitable" frame=void style="vertical-align:top; text-align:left; white-space:nowrap;"
!
! colspan="2" | Singular
! colspan="2" | Dual-Plural
|-
! First
| yishtin
| "I freeze"
| yiitin
| "we (2+) freeze"
|-
! Second
| nitin
| "you freeze"
| wohtin
| "you (2+) freeze"
|-
! Third
| colspan="4" style="text-align:center" | yitin "he/she/it/they freeze"
|-
! Fourth (3a)
| colspan="4" style="text-align:center" | jitin "he/she/they freeze"
|-
! Indefinite (3i)
| colspan="4" style="text-align:center" | atin "someone/something freezes"
|}

Classifiers (transitivity prefixes)
The "classifiers" are prefixes of position 9 (the closest to the verb stem) that affect the transitivity of the verb, in that they are valence and voice markers.  Calling them "classifiers" is a misnomer, however, as they do not classify anything and are not related to the classificatory verb stems (which actually do classify nouns, see classificatory verbs below). There are four classifiers: -∅-, -ł-, -d-, -l-. The -∅- classifier is the absence of a prefix, which is usually indicated by a null morpheme.

The -ł- classifier is a causative-transitivizing prefix of active verbs. It often can transitivize an intransitive -∅- verb: yibéézh "it's boiling" (yi-∅-béézh), yiłbéézh "he's boiling it (yi-ł-béézh); naʼniyęęsh "somethings flows about in a meandering fashion" (naʼni-∅-yęęsh), naʼniłhęęsh "he's making it flow about in a meandering fashion" (naʼni-ł-yęęsh).

The -d- classifier occurs in most passive, mediopassive, reflexive, and reciprocal verbs that are derived from verbs with a -∅- classifier: yizéés "he's singeing it" (yi-∅-zéés), yidéés "it's being singed" (yi-d-zéés).

The -l- occurs in most passive, mediopassive, reflexive, and reciprocal verbs that are derived from verbs with a -ł- classifier: néíłtsááh "he's drying it" (ná-yi-ł-tsááh), náltsááh it's being dried" (ná-l-tsááh).

Some verbs can occur with all four classifier prefixes:
 siʼą́ "roundish object lies in position" (-∅-ʼą́)
 haatʼą́ "roundish object was taken up & out (i.e. extracted)" (-d-ʼą́)
 séłʼą́ "I keep a roundish object in position" (-ł-ʼą́)
 néshʼą́ "I have my head in position" (-l-ʼą́)

In other verbs, the classifiers do not mark transitivity and are considered thematic prefixes that simply are required to occur with certain verb stems.

Modes, aspects and tenses

Navajo has a large number of aspectual, modal, and tense distinctions that are indicated by verb stem alternations (involving vowel and tonal ablaut and suffixation) often in combination with a range of prefixes. These are divided into seven "modes" and approximately twelve aspects and ten subaspects. (Although the term mode is traditionally used, most of the distinctions provided by the modes are in fact aspectual.) Each Navajo verb generally can occur in a number of mode and aspect category combinations.

Modes
Navajo has the following verb modes:
 Imperfective (describes an action/event that began but is seen as incomplete)
 Perfective (describes an action/event that began and is seen as complete)
 Progressive (describes an action/event that is ongoing)
 Future
 Usitative (describes an action/event that happens customarily but not always)
 Iterative (describes an action/event that happens repeatedly)
 Optative (describes a potential action/event in terms of the speaker’s wishes)

The modes above may have up to five distinct verb stem forms. The progressive and future modes share the same stem form as do the usitative and iterative modes. The optative mode usually has the same verb stem as the imperfective mode, although for some verbs the stem forms differ (in the example "to play, tease" below, the perfective and the optative stems are the same). For example, the verb meaning "to play, tease" has the following five stem forms for the seven modes:

Imperfective 
The imperfective indicates an event/action that has begun but remains incomplete. Although this mode does not refer to tense, it can usually be translated into English as a present tense form: yishááh "I'm (in the act of) going/coming", yishą́ "I'm (in the act of) eating (something)". With the addition of adverbials, the imperfective can be used for events/actions in the past, present, or future. The mode is used in the second person for immediate imperatives. The imperfective mode has a distinct imperfective stem form and four different mode-aspect prefix paradigms: (1) with a ni- terminative prefix in position 7 as in nishááh "I'm in the act of arriving", (2) with a si- stative prefix in position 7 as in shishʼaah "I'm in the act of placing a SRO" in dah shishʼaah "I'm in the act of placing a SRO up" (dah "up"), (3) with no prefix in position 7, usually identified as a ∅- prefix, as in yishcha "I'm crying", (4) with either a yi- transitional or yi- semelfactive prefix in position 6 (and no prefix in position 7).

Perfective 
The perfective indicates an event/action that has been completed. When referring to past situations, it usually corresponds to English simple past: yíyáʼ "I went/came/arrived", yíyą́ą́ʼ "I ate (something)". However, since the perfective mode is not a tense, it can be used to refer non-past actions, such as the future (where it may be translated as English "will have" + VERB). The perfective mode has a distinct perfective stem form and four different prefix paradigms: (1) with a yí- perfective prefix with a high tone in position 7 as in yíchʼid "I scratched it", (2) with a ní- terminative prefix with a high tone in position 7 as in níyá "I arrived", (3) with a sí- stative prefix with high tone in position 7 as in sélį́į́ʼ "I roasted it", (4) with a yi- transitional prefix in position 6 (and ∅- in position 7) as in yiizįʼ "I stood up".

Progressive and future 
The progressive indicates an incomplete event/action that is ongoing without reference to the beginning or end of the event/action. This mode may be translated into English as BE + VERB-ing + "along": yishááł "I'm going/walking along", yishtééł "I'm carrying it along".

The future mode is primarily a future tense – indicating a prospective event/action: deeshááł "I'll go/come", deeshį́į́ł "I'll eat (something)". The progressive mode has a yi- progressive prefix (in position 7), the future has a di- inceptive prefix (in position 6) and the yi- progressive prefix.

Usitative 
The usitative indicates a repetitive event/action that takes place customarily: yishááh "I usually go", yishdlį́į́h "I always drink (something)". The iterative is a frequentative indicating a recurrent event/action that takes place repeatedly and customarily: chʼínáshdááh "repeatedly go out" as in ahbínígo tłʼóóʼgóó chʼínáshdááh "I always (repeatedly) go outdoors in the morning" (ahbínígo "in the morning", tłʼóóʼgóó "outdoors"), náshdlį́į́h "drink (something) repeatedly" as in nínádiishʼnahgo gohwééh náshdlį́į́h "I drink coffee when I get up" (nínádiishʼnahgo "when I get up", gohwééh "coffee"). The iterative is distinguished from the usitative by a ná- repetitive prefix (in position 2) and also sometimes by a -d- or -ł- classifier prefix (in position 9).

Optative 
The optative indicates a positive or negative desire or wish. The mode is used with the addition of adverbial particles that follow the verb, such as laanaa and lágo: nahółtą́ą́ʼ laanaa "I wish it would rain", nahółtą́ą́ʼ lágo "I hope it doesn't rain". With punctual verbs, the optative mode can be used to form a negative imperative: shinóółʼį́į́ʼ (lágo) "don't look at me!". In certain adverbial frames, the optative indicates positive or negative potential.

Aspects and subaspects
The Primary aspects:
 Momentaneous – punctually (takes place point in time)
 Continuative – indefinite span of time & movement with specified direction
 Durative – indefinite span of time, non-locomotive uninterrupted continuum
 Repetitive – continuum of repeated acts or connected series of acts
 Conclusive – like durative but in perfective terminates with static sequel
 Semelfactive – single act in repetitive series of acts
 Distributive – distributive manipulation of objects or performance of actions
 Diversative – movement distributed among things (similar to distributive)
 Reversative – result in directional change
 Conative – attempted action
 Transitional – shift from one state to another
 Cursive – progression in a line through time/space (only progressive mode)

The subaspects:
 Completive – event/action simply takes place
 Terminative – stopping of action
 Stative – sequentially durative and static
 Inceptive – beginning of action
 Terminal – inherently terminal action
 Prolongative – arrested beginning or ending of action
 Seriative – interconnected series of successive separate & distinct acts
 Inchoative – focus on beginning of non-locomotion action
 Reversionary – return to previous state/location
 Semeliterative – single repetition of event/action

Navajo modes co-occur with various aspects. For example, the verb "rain falls" can occur in the perfective mode with the momentaneous and distributive aspects: -tsąąʼ (perfective momentaneous), -tsįʼ (perfective distributive). As with the modes, different aspects have different stem forms even when in the same mode, as seen with the previous "rain falls" perfective stems. Thus, a given verb has a set of stem forms that can be classified into both a mode and an aspect category. Verb stem paradigms of mode and aspect are given below for two different verbs:

As can be seen above, some aspect and mode combinations do not occur depending mostly upon the semantics of the particular verb. Additionally, some aspects do not occur at all with a particular verb. The patterns of verb stem alternations are very complex although there is a significant amount of homophony. A particularly important investigation into this area of the Navajo verb is Hardy (1979).

Classificatory verbs

Navajo has verb stems that classify a particular object by its shape or other physical characteristics in addition to describing the movement or state of the object. Athabaskan linguistics identifies these as classificatory verb stems and  usually identifies them with an acronym label. The eleven primary classificatory "handling" verb stems appear listed below (in the perfective mode):

To compare with English, Navajo has no single verb that corresponds to the English word give. To say the equivalent of Give me some hay!, the Navajo verb níłjool (NCM) must be used, while for Give me a cigarette! the verb nítįįh (SSO) must be used. The English verb give is expressed by eleven different verbs in Navajo, depending on the characteristics of the given object.

In addition to defining the physical properties of the object, primary classificatory verb stems also can distinguish between the manner of movement of the object. The stems may then be grouped into three different categories:

 handling
 propelling
 free flight

Handling includes actions such as carrying, lowering, and taking. Propelling includes tossing, dropping, and throwing. Free flight includes falling, and flying through space.

Using an example for the SRO category, Navajo has

 -ʼą́ "to handle (a round object)",
 -neʼ "to throw (a round object)", and
 -l-tsʼid "(a round object) moves independently".

yi-/bi- Alternation (animacy)
Like most Athabaskan languages, Southern Athabaskan languages show various levels of animacy in its grammar, with certain nouns taking specific verb forms according to their rank in this animacy hierarchy.  For instance, Navajo nouns can be ranked by animacy on a continuum from most animate (a human or lightning) to least animate (an abstraction) (Young & Morgan 1987: 65–66):

humans/lightning → infants/big animals → midsize animals → small animals → insects → natural forces → inanimate objects/plants → abstractions

Generally, the most animate noun in a sentence must occur first while the noun with lesser animacy occurs second.  If both nouns are equal in animacy, then either noun can occur in the first position. So, both example sentences (1) and (2) are correct.  The yi- prefix on the verb indicates that the 1st noun is the subject and bi- indicates that the 2nd noun is the subject.

But example sentence (3) sounds wrong to most Navajo speakers because the less animate noun occurs before the more animate noun:

To express this idea requires that the more animate noun occur first, as in sentence (4):

Note that although sentence (2) and (4) are translated into English with a passive verb, in Navajo it is not passive. Passive verbs are formed by certain classifier prefixes (i.e., transitivity prefixes) that occur directly before the verb stem in position 9. The yi-/bi- prefixes do not mark sentences as active or passive, but as direct or inverse.

Nouns
Many concepts expressed using nouns in other languages appear as verbs in Navajo. The majority of true nouns are not inflected for number, and there is no case marking. Noun phrases are often not needed to form grammatical sentences due to the informational content of the verb.

There are two main types of nouns in Navajo:

 simple nouns and
 nouns derived from verbs (called deverbal nouns)

The simple nouns can be distinguished by their ability to be inflected with a possessive prefix, as in

{| class="wikitable"
|-
! Noun stem
! Gloss
! Inflected
|-
| 
| "knife"
| 
|-
| 
| "pack"
| 
|}

Deverbal nouns are verbs (or verb phrases) that have been nominalized with a nominalizing enclitic or converted into a noun through zero derivation (that is, verbs that are used syntactically as nouns without an added nominalizer). An example of a nominalized verb is  "clock", which is derived from the verb  "it is moved slowly in a circle" and the enclitic nominalizer . Another example is the deverbal noun  "singer" (from verb  "he sings" + nominalizing enclitic ). Deverbal nouns can potentially be long and complex, such as

 the nominalized noun  "caterpillar tractor"
 the noun  "cannon"
 the postposition  "on it"
 the verb  "they sit up"
 the nominalizer

Possession
Possession in Navajo is expressed with personal pronoun prefixes:

{| class="IPA wikitable" frame=void style="vertical-align:top; text-align:left; white-space:nowrap;"
!
! Singular
! Dual
! Plural
|-
! First
| shi-
| nihi-
| danihi-
|-
! Second
| ni-
| nihi-
| danihi-
|-
! Third
| colspan="3" style="text-align:center" | bi-
|-
! Fourth (3o)
| colspan="3" style="text-align:center" | yi-
|-
! Fourth (3a)
| colspan="3" style="text-align:center" | ha-, hw-
|-
! Indefinite (3i)
| colspan="3" style="text-align:center" | a-
|}

Most of the time, these prefixes take a low tone, but in some nouns and postpositions, the final syllable of the prefix takes a high tone, such as shílaʼ "my hand," nihílaʼ "our/your hand."

The prefixes are also used when the possessor noun in a possessive phrase is a noun, as in Jáan bimá lit. "John his-mother," i.e., "John's mother."

Navajo marks inalienable possession for certain nouns – relatives, body parts, homes and dens.  These nouns can only appear with a possessive prefix, as in shimá "my mother."  If one wishes to speak of mothers in general, the 3rd person indefinite prefix ʼa- "someone's" is used, amá.

Postpositions
Navajo uses a number of postpositions where European languages tend to favor prepositions; thus, all spatial and most other relations such as under, on, or above are expressed by using the possessive prefix in combination with a postposition. All postpositions are inalienable, meaning that a prefix or fusion with a true noun is mandatory.

Examples include biyaa (under it), bikááʼ (on it), and bitah (among it). These can be combined with all prefixes to construct forms such as shiyaa (under me). Occasionally, postpositions are fused with true nouns to form a single word, such as Dinétah.

Numerals
Navajo uses a decimal (base-10) numeral system. There are unique words for the cardinal numbers 1–10. The numerals 11–19 are formed by adding an additive "plus 10" suffix  to the base numerals 1–9. The numerals 20–100 are formed by adding a multiplicative "times 10" suffix  to the base numerals 2–10.

{| class="wikitable"
!  !! base numeral
| rowspan="11" style="background-color: lightgrey;" |
! colspan="2" | +10
| rowspan="11" style="background-color: lightgrey;" |
! colspan="2" | x10
|-
! 1
|  ||  || (11)
| colspan="2" style="text-align: center;" | –
|-
! 2
|  ||  || (12) ||  || (20)
|-
! 3
|  ||  || (13) ||  || (30)
|-
! 4
|  ||  || (14) ||  || (40)
|-
! 5
|  ||  || (15) ||  || (50)
|-
! 6
|  ||  || (16) ||  || (60)
|-
! 7
|  ||  || (17) ||  || (70)
|-
! 8
|  ||  || (18) ||  || (80)
|-
! 9
|  ||  || (19) ||  || (90)
|-
! 10
| 
| colspan="2" style="text-align: center;" | –
|  || (100)
|}

In the compound numerals, the combining forms of the base numerals have irregular vowel and consonants changes. The numeral "1" has three forms:
  (used in counting "one", "two", "three", etc.)
  (a shortened combining form)
  (used in larger numbers and with a distributive plural prefix)

The combining form  is used in the compound  "11". The suffix loses its initial  becoming   when added to  "5". Several changes occur when the  suffix is added involving a loss of the final consonant or a reduction in vowel length:
  → 
  → 
  → 
  → 
  → 
  → 
  → 
  → 
  → 

For the cardinal numerals higher than 20 between the multiples of 10 (i.e., 21–29, 31–39, 41–49, etc.), there are two types of formations. The numerals 21–29 and 41–49 are formed by suffixing the ones digit to the tens digit, as in  "22" ( ←  "20" +  "2") and  "41" ( ←  "40" +  "1"). Here the  suffix appears in the combining form . The combining form  "1" is used as well:

{| class="wikitable"
! colspan="2" | 20
| rowspan="12" style="background-color: lightgrey;" |
! colspan="2" | 40
|-
|  || (20) ||  || (40)
|-
! colspan="2" | 21–29
! colspan="2" | 41–49
|-
|  || (21) ||  || (41)
|-
|  || (22) ||  || (42)
|-
|  || (23) ||  || (43)
|-
|  || (24) ||  || (44)
|-
|  || (25) ||  || (45)
|-
|  || (26) ||  || (46)
|-
|  || (27) ||  || (47)
|-
|  || (28) ||  || (48)
|-
|  || (29) ||  || (49)
|}

The other numerals are formed by placing dóó baʼąą "and in addition to it" between the tens digit and the ones digit, as in tádiin dóó baʼąą tʼááłáʼí "thirty-one" and ashdladiin dóó baʼąą tʼááʼ "fifty-three". The numerals 41–49 may also be formed in this manner: "forty-two dízdiin dóó baʼąą naaki or dízdįįnaaki.

The cardinal numerals 100–900 are formed by adding the multiplicative enclitic =di to the base numerals 1–9 and adding the word for "hundred" neeznádiin, as in tʼááłáhádí neeznádiin "one hundred", naakidi neeznádiin "two hundred", táadi neeznádiin "three hundred".

{| class="IPA wikitable" frame=void style="vertical-align:top; text-align:left; white-space:nowrap;"
!  !! base numeral !! x100 (=di + neeznádiin)
|-
! 1
| tʼááłáʼí || tʼááłáhádí neeznádiin (100)
|-
! 2
| naaki || naakidi neeznádiin (200)
|-
! 3
| tááʼ || táadi neeznádiin (300)
|-
! 4
| dį́į́ʼ || dį́įʼdi neeznádiin (400)
|-
! 5
| ashdlaʼ || ashdladi neeznádiin (500)
|-
! 6
| hastą́ą́h || hastą́ądi neeznádiin (600)
|-
! 7
| tsostsʼid || tsostsʼidi neeznádiin (700)
|-
! 8
| tseebíí || tseebíidi neeznádiin (800)
|-
! 9
| náhástʼéí || náhástʼéidi neeznádiin (900)
|}

The base numerals with a high tone in the last syllable change to a falling tone before =di.

For the thousands, the word mííl (from Spanish mil) is used in conjunction with =di: tʼááłáhádí mííl "one thousand", naakidi mííl "two thousand", etc. The word for "million" is formed by adding the stem -tsoh "big" to mííl: mííltsoh "million" as in tʼááłáhádí mííltsoh "one million", naakidi mííltsoh "two million", etc.

References

External links
 
 Remarks on the syntax of the Navajo verb part I: Preliminary observations on the structure of the verb (Ken Hale), lingphil.mit.edu
 
 A Computational Analysis of Navajo Verb Stems (David Eddington & Jordan Lachler), linguistics.byu.edu
 Grammaticization of Tense in Navajo: The Evolution of nt’éé (Chee, Ashworth, Buescher & Kubacki), linguistics.ucsb.edu
 A methodology for the investigation of speaker’s knowledge of structure in Athabaskan (Joyce McDonough & Rachel Sussman), urresearch.rochester.edu
 How to use Young and Morgan’s The Navajo Language (Joyce McDonough), www.researchgate.net
 Time in Navajo: Direct and Indirect Interpretation (Carlota S. Smith, Ellavina T. Perkins, Theodore B. Fernald), www.researchgate.net
 OLAC Resources in and about the Navajo language

Native American grammars
Grammar